Myurego (Dargwa: Мурега) is a rural locality (a selo) in Sergokalinsky District, Republic of Dagestan, Russia. The population was 4,228 as of 2010. There are 17 streets.

Geography 
Myurego is located 10 km southeast of Sergokala (the district's administrative centre) by road, on the Kakaozen river. Utamysh and Sergokala are the nearest rural localities.

Nationalities 
Dargins live there.

Famous residents 
 Mukhtar Gusengadzhiyev (actor of circus, film and television, Master of Yoga)

References 

Rural localities in Sergokalinsky District